Small Town Murder Scene is the second album by Canadian indie rock group FemBots, released in 2003 on Paper Bag Records.

Track listing

 "Intro"
 "Broken and Blue"
 "Prison Memoirs of an Anarchist"
 "The Transit Song"
 "A Million Dead End Jobs"
 "What Comes After One"
 "Small Town Murder Scene"
 "Mom's Ether Blues"
 "Theme from a Radio Play"
 "Tombstone Blues"
 "Outro"

2003 albums
Fembots (band) albums
Paper Bag Records albums